The 2022 Nornickel Curling Cup, the sixth edition of the traditional World Curling Tour event, was held from May 26 to 29 at the Taimyr Ice Arena in Dudinka, Russia. For all the teams competing, it was their final event of the 2021–22 curling season.

The WCT Arctic Cup is usually a tour event that attracts teams from all over the world. However, due to the Russian invasion of Ukraine, the 2022 edition of the event was contested between six Russian teams, including members from Belarus and Italy, three men's and three women's. Leading the field were the two Russian Olympic teams that represented the ROC at the 2022 Winter Olympics, Sergey Glukhov and Alina Kovaleva. The women's Olympic team from the 2014 Winter Olympics was also brought back together to play in this event, skipped by Anna Sidorova, as well as the men's team skip Alexey Stukalskiy. Four Russian players, Alexander Krushelnitskiy, Alexey Timofeev, Kristina Dudko and Anna Samoylik played with international teammates from Italy (men's) and Belarus (women's).

Summary
In the final, the Olympic men's team from 2022, consisting of Sergey Glukhov, Evgeny Klimov, Dmitry Mironov and Anton Kalalb won the title, defeating the Alexey Stukalskiy rink 7–6 in the final. After the game Glukhov said that "This year the tournament had an unusual format, I think that both guys and girls were interested in playing. The final came out tense. The game went to the last stone, there were a lot of difficult shots. Dudinka was the last tournament of the season. It's nice to win and go on vacation in a good mood, especially since the tournament did not start easily." Team Glukhov began the event losing their first two games to Anna Sidorova and Alexey Stukalskiy. On the brink of elimination, the team won three their last three games to qualify for the playoffs as the third seed. They reached the final with a 4–2 victory over Alina Kovaleva in the semifinal round. Team Stukalskiy took an easier route to the playoffs, beginning by winning four straight games. After a loss to the Sidorova rink in their final round robin game, they took revenge in the semifinal by defeating the Russian women's team 11–3.

In the third place game, the 2022 Russian Olympic women's team of Alina Kovaleva, Yulia Portunova, Galina Arsenkina, Ekaterina Kuzmina and Maria Komarova scored one in the final end to defeat the Sidorova rink 4–3. "We are delighted to have won this match for third place," said Kovaleva after the game. "I really like to come to Dudinka. There is always a warm welcome, excellent organization, spectacular opening and closing ceremonies. Here you will not see such shows anywhere, especially on curling." Team Kovaleva went 3–2 through the qualifying stage before dropping their semifinal game to the Stukalskiy rink. For Team Sidorova, which consisted of Anna Sidorova, Margarita Fomina, Nkeirouka Ezekh and Ekaterina Galkina, this was their first event playing together since disbanding at the end of the 2018–19 season. While they were together, the team won five medals at the World Women's Curling Championship, one silver and four bronze. Before the event began, Sidorova noted that she was happy to be reunited with her "golden squad." "For me, this is a special tournament, because we play in Dudinka with our golden squad. The very beginning of my career, my own awards and medals of our country at international competitions. Therefore, with great warmth and just love, we now go and pour out what has accumulated, how we missed, and enjoy spending time on the ice and beyond."

Teams
The teams are listed as follows:

Round-robin standings
Final round-robin standings

Round-robin results
All draw times are listed in Krasnoyarsk Standard Time (UTC+07:00).

Draw 1
Thursday, May 26, 16:00

Draw 2
Friday, May 27, 9:00

Draw 3
Friday, May 27, 16:00

Draw 4
Friday, May 27, 19:00

Draw 5
Saturday, May 28, 9:00

Draw 6
Saturday, May 28, 12:00

Draw 7
Saturday, May 28, 16:00

Draw 8
Saturday, May 28, 19:00

Playoffs
Source:

Semifinals
Sunday, May 29, 10:00

Third place game
Sunday, May 29, 14:00

Final
Sunday, May 29, 14:00

References

External links
Official Site

2022 in Russian sport
2022 in curling
International curling competitions hosted by Russia
Sport in Krasnoyarsk Krai